Suica is a contactless smart card used in Japan.

Suica, Šuica or Șuica can also refer to:

Persons
Dubravka Šuica

Places 
Šujica, Dobrova–Polhov Gradec, a village in Slovenia
Šuica, Bosnia and Herzegovina
Șuica, a village in the commune Scornicești, Olt County, Romania

Rivers 
Šuica (river), Bosnia and Herzegovina
Șuica, a tributary of the Negrișoara in Olt County, Romania